Joel Rosenberg may refer to:

 Joel Rosenberg (science fiction author) (1954–2011), Canadian American science fiction and fantasy author
 Joel  C. Rosenberg (born 1967), American political pundit, and author of The Last Jihad Series